Calyptochloa is a genus of grass (family Poaceae). It includes three species, which are endemic to Queensland, Australia.

Species
Three species are accepted:
 Calyptochloa cylindrosperma E.J.Thomps. & B.K.Simon
 Calyptochloa gracillima C.E.Hubb.
 Calyptochloa johnsoniana E.J.Thomps. & B.K.Simon

See also 
 List of Poaceae genera

References

Panicoideae
Endemic flora of Queensland
Poales of Australia